12 (twelve) is the natural number following 11 and preceding 13. Twelve is a superior highly composite number, divisible by 2, 3, 4, and 6.

It is the number of years required for an orbital period of Jupiter. It is central to many systems of timekeeping, including the Western calendar and units of time of day and frequently appears in the world's major religions.

Name
Twelve is the largest number with a single-syllable name in English. Early Germanic numbers have been theorized to have been non-decimal: evidence includes the unusual phrasing of eleven and twelve, the former use of "hundred" to refer to groups of 120, and the presence of glosses such as "tentywise" or "ten-count" in medieval texts showing that writers could not presume their readers would normally understand them that way. Such uses gradually disappeared with the introduction of Arabic numerals during the 12th-century Renaissance.

It has cognates in every Germanic language (e.g. It is sometimes compared with the Lithuanian , although  is used as the suffix for all numbers from 11 to 19 (analogous to "-teen"). Every other Indo-European language instead uses a form of "two"+"ten", such as the Latin . The usual ordinal form is "twelfth" but "dozenth" or "duodecimal" (from the Latin word) is also used in some contexts, particularly base-12 numeration. Similarly, a group of twelve things is usually a "dozen" but may also be referred to as a "dodecad" or "duodecad". The adjective referring to a group of twelve is "duodecuple".

The Lithuanian suffix is also considered to share a similar development. The suffix  has also been connected with reconstructions of the Proto-Germanic for ten.

As mentioned above, 12 has its own name in Germanic languages such as English (dozen), Dutch, German, and Swedish, all derived from Old French . It is a compound number in many other languages, e.g. Italian  (but in Spanish and Portuguese, 16, and in French, 17 is the first compound number), Japanese 十二 jūni.

Written representation
In prose writing, twelve, being the last single-syllable numeral, is sometimes taken as the last number to be written as a word, and 13 the first to be written using digits.
This is not a binding rule, and in English language tradition, it is sometimes recommended to spell out numbers up to and including either nine, ten or twelve, or even  ninety-nine or one hundred. Another system spells out all numbers written in one or two words (sixteen, twenty-seven, fifteen thousand, but 372 or 15,001).
In German orthography, there used to be the widely followed (but unofficial) rule of spelling out numbers up to twelve  (zwölf). The Duden (the German standard dictionary) mentions this rule as outdated.

Mathematical properties
Twelve is the sixth composite number, and the smallest number with exactly six divisors, its divisors being 1, 2, 3, 4, 6 and 12. It is a pronic number, and the smallest abundant number, since it is the smallest integer for which the sum of its proper divisors (1 + 2 + 3 + 4 + 6 = 16) is greater than itself. It is the second semiperfect number, since there is a subset of the proper divisors of 12 that add up to itself. If an odd perfect number is of the form 12k + 1, it will have at least twelve distinct prime factors. Twelve is the fifth highly composite number, the next one being twenty-four and the previous six (uniquely, twice twelve and half of twelve, respectively). 12, as a number with a perfect number of divisors (six), has a sum of divisors that yields the second perfect number, σ(12) = 28. In turn, 28 is the arithmetic mean of the twelve divisors of the fourth harmonic divisor number, 140 (like 6, and 28), which generate an integer harmonic mean of 5. It is the smallest of two known sublime numbers, which are numbers that have a perfect number of divisors whose sum is also perfect. 

Twelve is the number of divisors of 60 and 90, the second and third unitary perfect numbers (6 is the first). It is also the number of distinct prime factors that belong to the fifth unitary perfect number, the largest known, 
.

12 is the fifth Pell number, preceded by 0, 1, 2, and 5, as well as the third pentagonal number. 12 is the superfactorial of 3. It is also a Harshad number in all bases except octal. 

There are 12 Latin squares of size 3 × 3, where symbols appear exactly once in each row and exactly once in each column.

There are twelve Jacobian elliptic functions and twelve cubic distance-transitive graphs. 

A twelve-sided polygon is a dodecagon. In its regular form, it is the largest polygon that can uniformly tile the plane alongside other regular polygons, as with the truncated hexagonal tiling or the truncated trihexagonal tiling. There are 12 regular and semiregular tilings when enantiomorphic forms of the snub hexagonal tiling are counted separately.   

A regular dodecahedron has twelve pentagonal faces. Regular cubes and octahedrons both have 12 edges, while regular icosahedrons have 12 vertices. The rhombic dodecahedron has twelve rhombic faces and is able to tessellate three-dimensional space. Its dual polyhedron, the cuboctahedron, has 12 vertices with radial equilateral symmetry, and is one of two quasiregular polyhedra.

The densest three-dimensional lattice sphere packing has each sphere touching twelve other spheres, and this is almost certainly true for any arrangement of spheres (the Kepler conjecture). Twelve is also the kissing number in three dimensions.

There are twelve complex apeirotopes in dimensions five and higher, which include van Oss polytopes in the form of complex -orthoplexes. There are also twelve paracompact hyperbolic Coxeter groups of uniform polytopes in five-dimensional space.

Bring's curve is a Riemann surface of genus four, with a domain that is a regular hyperbolic 20-sided icosagon.

Twelve is the smallest weight for which a cusp form exists. This cusp form is the discriminant  whose Fourier coefficients are given by the Ramanujan -function and which is (up to a constant multiplier) the 24th power of the Dedekind eta function: 

This fact is related to a constellation of interesting appearances of the number twelve in mathematics ranging from the fact that the abelianization of SL(2,Z) has twelve elements, to the value of the Riemann zeta function at −1 being . 

As the negative reciprocal of the Ramanujan summation of the infinite series 1 + 2 + 3 + 4 + ⋯ at ζ(−1),

Although the series is divergent, methods such as Ramanujan summation can assign finite values to divergent series.

List of basic calculations

In other bases

The duodecimal system (1210 [twelve] = 1012), which is the use of 12 as a division factor for many ancient and medieval weights and measures, including hours, probably originates from Mesopotamia.

In base thirteen and higher bases (such as hexadecimal), twelve is represented as C.

In nature
Notably, twelve is the number of full lunations in a solar year, hence the number of months in a solar calendar, as well as the number of signs in the Western and the Chinese zodiac. Twelve is also the number of years for an orbital period of Jupiter.

Religion
The number twelve carries religious, mythological and magical  symbolism, generally representing perfection, entirety, or cosmic order in traditions since antiquity.

Ancient Greek religion 
The Twelve Olympians are the principal gods of the pantheon, they were preceded by twelve Titans, and Hercules carries out twelve labours. 
Several sets of twelve cities are identified in history as a dodecapolis, the most familiar being the Etruscan League. In ancient Rome, the twelve lictors carried fasces of twelve rods.

Judaism and Christianity 
 The significance is especially pronounced in the Hebrew Bible.
Ishmael - the first-born son of Abraham - has 12 sons/princes (Genesis 25:16), and Jacob also has 12 sons, who are the progenitors of the Twelve Tribes of Israel. This is reflected in Christian tradition, notably  in the twelve Apostles. When Judas Iscariot is disgraced, a meeting is held (Acts) to add Saint Matthias to complete the number twelve once more.
The Book of Revelation contains much numerical symbolism, and many of the numbers mentioned have 12 as a divisor.  mentions a woman—interpreted as the people of Israel, the Church and the Virgin Mary—wearing a crown of twelve stars (representing each of the twelve tribes of Israel). Furthermore, there are 12,000 people sealed from each of the twelve tribes of Israel (the Tribe of Dan is omitted while Manasseh is mentioned), making a total of 144,000 (which is the square of 12 multiplied by a thousand).
 According to the New Testament, Jesus had twelve Apostles.
 The "Twelve Days of Christmas" count the interval between Christmas and  Epiphany. 
 Eastern Orthodoxy observes twelve Great Feasts.

Hinduism 
 There are twelve Jyotirlinga (Self-formed Lingas) of Lord Shiva in Hindu temples across India according to the Shaiva tradition.
 The Sun god Surya has 12 names.
 The Monkey god Hanuman has 12 names.
 There are 12 Petals in Anahata or "heart chakra".
 There are frequently said to be 12 Âdityas.

Others 
 The chief Norse god, Odin, has twelve sons.  
In the King Arthur legend, Arthur is said to subdue 12 rebel princes and to win 12 great battles against Saxon invaders.  
In Twelver Shi'a Islam, there are twelve Imams, legitimate successors of the Islamic prophet, Muhammad. These twelve early leaders of Islam are—Ali, Hasan, Husayn, and nine of Husayn's descendants. Sura 12 in the Quran is sura Yusuf, narrating the story of the sons of Jacob.

Law

 The number of twelve jurors in jury trials is depicted by Aeschylus in the Eumenides. In the play, the innovation is brought about by the goddess Athena, who summons twelve citizens to sit as jury.
In English Common Law, the tradition of twelve jurors harks back to the 10th-century law code introduced by Aethelred the Unready.

Timekeeping
 The lunar year is 12 lunar months. Adding 11 or 12 days completes the solar year. 
 Most calendar systems – solar or lunar – have twelve months in a year.
 The Chinese use a 12-year cycle for time-reckoning called Earthly Branches.
 There are twelve hours in a half day, numbered one to twelve for both the ante meridiem (a.m.) and the post meridiem (p.m.). 12:00 p.m. is midday or noon, and 12:00 a.m. is midnight. 
 The basic units of time (60 seconds, 60 minutes, 24 hours) are evenly divisible by twelve into smaller units.

In numeral systems

In science
The atomic number of magnesium in the periodic table.
The Standard Model identifies twelve types of elementary fermions as well as twelve types of elementary gauge bosons.
The human body has twelve cranial nerves.
The duodenum (from ) is the first part of the small intestine, that is about twelve inches (30 cm) long. More precisely, this section of the intestine was measured not in inches but in fingerwidths. In fact, in German the name of the duodenum is Zwölffingerdarm, in Dutch the name is twaalfvingerige darm and in Bulgarian the name is дванадесетопръстник, all meaning "twelve-finger bowel".
Force 12 on the Beaufort wind force scale corresponds to the maximum wind speed of a hurricane.
The human body has twelve thoracic vertebrae.

In sports

 In both soccer and American football, the number 12 can be a symbolic reference to the fans because of the support they give to the 11 players on the field. Texas A&M University reserves the number 12 jersey for a walk-on player who represents the original "12th Man", a fan who was asked to play when the team's reserves were low in a college American football game in 1922. Similarly, Bayern Munich, Hammarby, Feyenoord, Atlético Mineiro, Flamengo, Seattle Seahawks, Portsmouth and Cork City do not allow field players to wear the number 12 on their jersey because it is reserved for their supporters. It also serves as the jersey number for some the National Football League's best and most well-known quarterback, Tom Brady.
 In Canadian football, 12 is the maximum number of players that can be on the field of play for each team at any time.
 In cricket, another sport with eleven players per team, teams may select a "12th man", who may replace an injured player for the purpose of fielding (but not batting or bowling).
 In women's lacrosse, each team has 12 players on the field at any given time, except in penalty situations.
 In rugby league, one of the starting second-row forwards wears the number 12 jersey in most competitions. An exception is in the Super League, which uses static squad numbering.
 In rugby union, one of the starting centres, most often but not always the inside centre, wears the 12 shirt.
 In an NBA game, a quarter lasts 12 minutes.

In technology
ASCII and Unicode code point for form feed.
 The number of function keys on most PC keyboards (F1 through F12). 
 The number of keys in any standard digital telephone (1 through 9, 0, * and #). 
 Microsoft's Rich Text Format specification assigns numbers congruent to 12 mod 256 to variants of the French language.

In the arts

Film
Films with the number twelve or its variations in their titles include: 
12
12 Angry Men (1957 and 1997)
Cheaper by the Dozen
Ocean's Twelve
12 Monkeys
The Dirty Dozen
The Twelve Chairs (1970, 1971 and 1976)
12 Rounds
Twelve
Twelve Years a Slave

Television
The number twelve plays a significant role in the television franchise Battlestar Galactica. The characters come from the Twelve Colonies of Kobol and worship the twelve gods of Kobol. In the re-imagined series, there are also twelve models of humanoid Cylons.
Twelve Angry Men, the original 1954 live performance on the anthology television series Studio One
"Number 12 Looks Just Like You" is an episode of the television show The Twilight Zone.
Schoolhouse Rock! portrayed an alien child using base-twelve arithmetic in the short "Little Twelvetoes".
12 oz. Mouse was an animated television show on Adult Swim.
 The News 12 Networks are a group of American regional cable news television channels covering New York, New Jersey, and Connecticut.
  is a French game show broadcast on TF1 with Oliver Minne at midday CEST.
 In Star Twinkle PreCure, the Star Palace is home to the twelve Star Princesses, one for each sign of the Zodiac.

Theatre
 Twelfth Night is a comedy by William Shakespeare. 
 The Vision of the Twelve Goddesses is a Jacobean masque by Samuel Daniel. 
 Twelve Angry Men, by Reginald Rose, adapted from his own teleplay (see above).

Literature
 "The Twelve" is a poem by Aleksandr Blok. 
 Twelve is a novel by Nick McDonell. 
 The Twelve Chairs is a satirical novel by the Soviet authors Ilf and Petrov. 
 Cheaper by the Dozen is a 1946 novel by Frank Bunker Gilbreth Jr. and Ernestine Gilbreth Carey. 
 The Twelve Dancing Princesses is a folk tale. 
 The Aeneid, an epic poem by Virgil is divided into two halves composed of twelve books.
 Paradise Lost, an epic poem by John Milton is divided into twelve books perhaps in imitation of the Aeneid. 
 Miguel de Cervantes wrote twelve Novelas ejemplares.
 The number twelve is a key feature in the plot of the novel Murder on the Orient Express by Agatha Christie.

Music

Music theory
Twelve is the number of pitch classes in an octave, not counting the duplicated (octave) pitch. Also, the total number of major keys, (not counting enharmonic equivalents) and the total number of minor keys (also not counting equivalents). This applies only to twelve tone equal temperament, the most common tuning used today in western influenced music.
The twelfth is the interval of an octave and a fifth. Instruments such as the clarinet which behave as a stopped cylindrical pipe overblow at the twelfth.
The twelve-tone technique (also dodecaphony) is a method of musical composition devised by Arnold Schoenberg. Music using the technique is called twelve-tone music.
The twelve-bar blues is one of the most prominent chord progressions in popular music.
12-inch record, see Phonograph record#78 rpm disc sizes.

Pop music

 The 12-inch single is a vinyl record format.
Twelfth Night is a progressive rock band. 
12 Play is an R. Kelly album.
The Number 12 Looks Like You is a mathcore band.
"12", a song from the album Brave Murder Day by Katatonia.
12 is a studio album by German singer Herbert Grönemeyer.
Twelve is an album by Patti Smith.
Twelve Deadly Cyns...and Then Some is an album by Cyndi Lauper.
D12 a rap group also known as the Dirty Dozen.
12 Stones is an American Christian rock band. 
"12 Hundred" is a song by band Mushroomhead of their Savior Sorrow album.
12 is the 12th studio album by Keller Williams.
"12" ("Dodeka" in Greek) is one of the most well-known hits by Anna Vissi. 
"Twelve drummers drumming" is the gift on the twelfth day of Christmas in the carol "The Twelve Days of Christmas". 
Twelve Girls Band are an all female Chinese musical group . 
12 (American Song Book) is an album by Italian singer Mina. 
"Revelation #12" is a song by American rock band Marilyn Manson.
 12 is the maximum score a competing entry can receive by each country in the Eurovision Song Contest.

Art theory
 There are twelve basic hues in the color wheel: three primary colors (red, yellow, blue), three secondary colors (orange, green & purple) and six tertiary colors (names for these vary, but are intermediates between the primaries and secondaries).

Games
 In the game of craps, a dice roll of two sixes (value 12) on the come-out roll constitutes a "craps" and the shooter (dice thrower) loses immediately.
 Twelve is a character in the Street Fighter video game series.
 Games such as Backgammon have a long history of 12 points on each side of the gaming board, as evidenced in the XII scripta board in the museum at Ephesus.

In other fields

There are 12 troy ounces in a troy pound (used for precious metals).
Twelve of something is called a dozen.
In the former British currency system, there were twelve pence in a shilling.
In Greek mythology, the number of Labours of Heracles was increased from ten to make twelve.
In English, twelve is the number of greatest magnitude that has just one syllable and the last one to contain a single syllable.

12 is the last number featured on the analogue clock, and also the starting point of the transition from A.M. to P.M. hours or vice-versa.
There are twelve months within a year, with the last one being December.
The level of grades in which one must attend school typically ends at 12 (although some jurisdictions may include a thirteenth grade depending on the country).
Twelve hours form half a day, and twelve hours away from another lead to the same time but with a different period (ex. Twelve hours away from 6:00AM leads to 6:00PM).
There are normally twelve pairs of ribs in the human body.
The Twelve Tables or Leges Duodecim Tabularum, more informally simply Duodecim Tabulae, was the ancient legislation underlying Roman law.
In the United States, twelve people are appointed to sit on a jury for felony trials in all but four states, and in federal and Washington, D.C. courts. The number of jurors gave the title to the play (and subsequent films) Twelve Angry Men.
Twelve men have walked on Earth's moon.
The United States is divided into twelve Federal Reserve Districts (Boston, New York, Philadelphia, Cleveland, Richmond, Atlanta, Chicago, St. Louis, Minneapolis, Kansas City, Dallas, and San Francisco); American paper currency has serial numbers beginning with one of twelve different letters, A through L, representing the Federal Reserve Bank from which the currency originated.
According to UFO conspiracy theory, Majestic 12 is a secret committee, allegedly set up by U.S. President Harry S. Truman to investigate the Roswell UFO incident and cover up future extraterrestrial contact.
12 is the number of the French department Aveyron.
King Arthur's Round Table had 12 knights plus King Arthur himself.
12 inches in a foot.
Alcoholics Anonymous has 12 steps, 12 traditions and 12 concepts for world service.
Wilhelm Heinrich Schüßler developed a list of 12 biochemical cell salts, also known as tissue salts.

See also 
 The Twelfth

Notes

References

Citations

Sources 

 Books
 

 Journal articles

 
 .

External links 
 

 
Integers
Numerology